Omar Najdi (born 24 September 1986) is a Moroccan footballer.

He currently plays as a forward  as well as the Moroccan national team.

References

External links
 Profile at mountakhab.net
 Profile at mountakhab.net

Moroccan footballers
1986 births
Living people
Hassania Agadir players
People from Agadir
Expatriate footballers in Egypt
Moroccan expatriate footballers
Raja CA players
Wydad AC players
Misr Lel Makkasa SC players
Al-Shaab CSC players
UAE First Division League players
Association football forwards